Abram-Perezville is a former census-designated place (CDP) in Hidalgo County, Texas. The population was 5,376 at the 2010 United States Census. It is part of the McAllen–Edinburg–Mission Metropolitan Statistical Area. For the 2010 census, the CDP was split into Abram and Perezville.

Geography
Abram-Perezville is located at  (26.238767, -98.404720).

Demographics
As of the census of 2000, there were 5,444 people, 1,617 households, and 1,387 families residing in the CDP. The population density was 1,073.9 people per square mile (414.6/km2). There were 3,060 housing units at an average density of 603.6/sq mi (233.0/km2). The racial makeup of the CDP was 47.17% White, 0.22% African American, 0.06% Asian, 48.79% from other races, and 3.77% from two or more races. Hispanic or Latino of any race were 81.59% of the population.

There were 1,617 households, out of which 42.7% had children under the age of 18 living with them, 72.9% were married couples living together, 10.2% had a female householder with no husband present, and 14.2% were non-families. 11.6% of all households were made up of individuals, and 8.2% had someone living alone who was 65 years of age or older. The average household size was 3.37 and the average family size was 3.67.

In the CDP, the population was spread out, with 32.8% under the age of 18, 11.0% from 18 to 24, 24.3% from 25 to 44, 14.0% from 45 to 64, and 17.9% who were 65 years of age or older. The median age was 29 years. For every 100 females, there were 94.0 males. For every 100 females age 18 and over, there were 91.8 males.

The median income for a household in the CDP was $22,532, and the median income for a family was $23,956. Males had a median income of $19,044 versus $18,188 for females. The per capita income for the CDP was $8,195. About 32.4% of families and 41.0% of the population were below the poverty line, including 56.8% of those under age 18 and 9.5% of those age 65 or over.

Education 
Abram-Perezville is served by the La Joya Independent School District.

In addition, residents are allowed to apply to magnet schools operated by the South Texas Independent School District.

References

Census-designated places in Hidalgo County, Texas
Census-designated places in Texas